Al-Mukhtar ibn Abi Ubayd al-Thaqafi (– 3 April 687) was a pro-Alid revolutionary based in Kufa, who led a rebellion against the Umayyad Caliphate in 685 and ruled over most of Iraq for eighteen months during the Second Fitna.

Born in Ta'if, Mukhtar moved to Iraq at a young age and grew up in Kufa. Following the death of Husayn ibn Ali, a grandson of the Islamic prophet Muhammad, at the hands of the Umayyad army in the Battle of Karbala in 680, he allied with the rival caliph Abd Allah ibn al-Zubayr in Mecca, but the alliance was short-lived. Mukhtar returned to Kufa where he declared Muhammad ibn al-Hanafiyya, a son of caliph Ali (r. 656–661) and brother of Husayn, the mahdi and the imam, and called for the establishment of an Alid caliphate and retaliation for Husayn's killing. He took over Kufa in October 685, after expelling its Zubayrid governor, and later ordered the execution of those involved in the killing of Husayn. Hostile relations with Ibn al-Zubayr ultimately led to Mukhtar's death by the forces of the Zubayrid governor of Basra, Mus'ab ibn al-Zubayr, following a four-month siege.

Although Mukhtar was defeated, his movement would have far-reaching consequences. After his death, his followers formed a radical Shi'a sect, later known as the Kaysanites, who developed several novel doctrines and influenced later Shi'a ideology. Mukhtar raised the social status of mawali (non-Arab local converts to Islam) and they became an important political entity. The mawali and Kaysanites went on to play a significant role in the Abbasid Revolution sixty years later. Mukhtar was important as an early proponent of treating Arab and non-Arab Muslims on an equal footing. He is a controversial figure among Muslims; condemned by many as a false prophet, but revered by Shi'a because of his support for the Alids. Modern historians' views range from regarding him as a sincere revolutionary to an ambitious opportunist.

Background

Mukhtar was born in Ta'if in 622 CE (the year that the Islamic prophet Muhammad migrated to Medina) to Abu Ubayd al-Thaqafi, a Muslim army commander from the Banu Thaqif tribe, and Dawma bint Amr ibn Wahb ibn Muattib. Following Muhammad's death in 632, Abu Bakr became caliph. He died two years later and was succeeded by Umar, who expanded the Muslim conquests initiated by Abu Bakr, and sent Mukhtar's father Abu Ubayd to the Iraqi front. Abu Ubayd was killed at the Battle of the Bridge in November 634. Mukhtar, then thirteen years old, remained in Iraq after the Muslim conquest of this region, and was raised by his uncle Sa'd ibn Masud al-Thaqafi. Umar was assassinated by the Persian slave Abu Lu'lu'a Firuz in 644, after which his successor, Uthman, ruled for twelve years before being assassinated by rebels in 656.

After Uthman's death, Ali, a cousin and son-in-law of Muhammad, became caliph and moved the capital from Medina to Kufa, where Mukhtar held some minor office under him, and Mukhtar's uncle became governor of nearby al-Mada'in. A few companions of Muhammad, including Mu'awiya, the governor of Syria, refused to recognise Ali's authority, and war broke out. The Battle of Siffin ended in stalemate (July 657), when Ali's forces refused to fight in response to Mu'awiya's calls for arbitration. Ali reluctantly agreed to talks but a faction of his forces, later called Kharijites, broke away in protest, condemning Ali's acceptance of arbitration as blasphemous. Arbitration could not settle the dispute between Mu'awiya and Ali and the latter was subsequently murdered by a Kharijite in January 661.

Ali's eldest son Hasan became caliph, but Mu'awiya challenged his authority and invaded Iraq. While Hasan was mobilizing his troops, he was injured by a Kharijite near al-Mada'in and was brought to the home of Mukhtar's uncle. There, Mukhtar reportedly recommended that Hasan be handed over to Mu'awiya in return for political favour, but was rebuffed by his uncle. In August 661, Hasan abdicated the caliphate to Mu'awiya in a peace treaty and the capital was transferred to Damascus. A few years before his death, Mu'awiya nominated his son Yazid as his successor, thus founding the Umayyad Caliphate. Yazid's nomination angered Alid partisans, because it was seen as the violation of the peace treaty, which stipulated that Mu'awiya would not nominate a successor. Scant information exists about Mukhtar's early life and he only rose to prominence when he was aged around sixty.

Revolt
Upon Yazid's accession in April 680, pro-Alid Kufans urged Husayn ibn Ali, the younger brother of now deceased Hasan, to lead a revolt against Yazid. Husayn subsequently sent his cousin Muslim ibn Aqil to assess the political environment in Kufa. Mukhtar hosted Ibn Aqil at his house before the arrival of Ubayd Allah ibn Ziyad. The latter was appointed to replace Mukhtar's father-in-law, Nu'man ibn Bashir, as governor due to Ibn Bashir's benign attitude toward Ibn Aqil and his followers. As a result of Ibn Ziyad's suppression and political maneuvering, Ibn Aqil's following started melting away and he was forced to declare the revolt prematurely. Mukhtar was not in the city at the time. After hearing the news, he attempted to gather supporters from Kufa's environs, but Ibn Aqil's revolt was defeated and he was executed before Mukhtar returned to the city. Mukhtar was arrested and brought to the governor but he denied involvement in the revolt. While Mukhtar was imprisoned, Husayn was slain by Ibn Ziyad's forces at the Battle of Karbala on 10 October 680. Mukhtar was afterward released upon the intervention of Abdullah ibn Umar, an influential son of the second caliph and Mukhtar's brother-in-law, and ordered to leave Kufa.

Exile in Mecca
By this time, Abd Allah ibn al-Zubayr, a son of Muhammad's companion Zubayr ibn al-Awwam, secretly started taking allegiance in Mecca and came to control the entire Hejaz (western Arabia). Having left Kufa, Mukhtar headed for Mecca and offered allegiance to Ibn al-Zubayr on the condition that he be consulted about important matters and awarded a high post, which Ibn al-Zubayr refused. Mukhtar then left for Ta'if and, after one year, Ibn al-Zubayr, persuaded by his advisers, accepted Mukhtar's homage under the same terms. When Yazid dispatched an army to retake Mecca in 683, Mukhtar participated in the city's defence. After Yazid died in November, the Umayyad army retreated and Ibn al-Zubayr openly proclaimed his caliphate. Mukhtar was informed by people coming from Kufa that the city had come under Ibn al-Zubayr's control but many Kufans were looking for an independent leader of their own. He claimed that he was the man they were looking for. While in Mecca, he sought permission from Ali's son, Muhammad ibn al-Hanafiyyah, to avenge Husayn's death and secure power for Ibn al-Hanafiyyah. The latter responded that he neither approved nor disapproved of such an action, but bloodshed should be avoided. Earlier, he had made the same offer to Husayn's son Ali Zayn al-Abidin but was refused. Five months after Yazid's death, he returned to Kufa without informing Ibn al-Zubayr, who he thought had not kept his promise. Some accounts state that Ibn al-Zubayr himself sent him to Kufa as governor with instructions to gather force capable of resisting Umayyad attempts to reconquer Iraq. This is considered unlikely by the modern historians.

Return to Kufa

In Kufa, Mukhtar began recruiting people to take revenge against the killers of Husayn, promising them victory and fortune. At the same time, Sulayman ibn Surad, a companion of Muhammad and an Alid supporter, was rallying a group of Kufans, who called themselves Tawwabin, to fight the Umayyads to atone for their failure to support Husayn during the Battle of Karbala. The Tawwabin movement created difficulties for Mukhtar. Most pro-Alid Kufans supported Ibn Surad because he was Muhammad's companion, and as a result, Mukhtar was unable to attract many recruits. He criticised the Tawwabin's actions as premature and destined for failure, arguing that Ibn Surad was old, weak, and militarily inexperienced. He then claimed that he was a lieutenant of Ibn al-Hanafiyyah, whom he called the Mahdi (Messiah). He convinced many Alid partisans, including some five hundred mawali (sing. mawlā; local converts to Islam), that he was working under the orders of the Mahdi.

Doubting the authenticity of Mukhtar's claims, a group of Alid partisans from Kufa went to Mecca seeking verification from Ibn al-Hanafiyyah. He replied in an ambiguous manner that he was satisfied with anyone whom God uses to take revenge on enemies of the family of the prophet. They interpreted this as confirmation of Mukhtar's claims and returned to join him. To win over the hitherto unpersuaded Ibrahim ibn al-Ashtar, an influential Alid partisan and head of the Nakhai tribe, Mukhtar presented him with a letter, which he claimed was authored by Ibn al-Hanafiyyah. In it, Ibn al-Hanafiyyah ostensibly called himself the Mahdi and urged Ibn al-Ashtar to support Mukhtar. After expressing some doubts, Ibn al-Ashtar eventually joined him. The letter was likely fabricated, and Ibn al-Hanafiyyah seems to have had no involvement in the revolt. He tolerated the use of his name, however, and did not disapprove of Mukhtar's activities. Nonetheless, when he wanted to visit his followers in Kufa, he was deterred by a rumour, floated by Mukhtar upon hearing this news, that the true Mahdi would not die if struck by a sword.

Ibn al-Zubayr appointed Abd Allah ibn Yazid as governor of Kufa in 684. Fearful of Mukhtar, Ibn Yazid imprisoned him. Some time later, Abdullah ibn Umar interceded for Mukhtar, who promised to refrain from anti-government activity and was released.

Overthrow of the Zubayrid governor

After his release Mukhtar resumed his revolutionary activities. The Tawwabin were defeated by the Umayyads at the Battle of Ayn al-Warda in January 685, and most of the pro-Alid Kufans shifted allegiance to Mukhtar. Ibn al-Zubayr replaced Ibn Yazid with Abd Allah ibn Muti as governor to contain the expected agitation but to no avail. Mukhtar and his followers planned to overthrow the governor and seize control of Kufa on Thursday, 19 October 685. On  the evening of 17 October Mukhtar's men clashed with government forces. Mukhtar signaled an early declaration of revolt to his troops by lighting fires. By the evening of Wednesday, 18 October, the government's forces were defeated. Ibn Muti went into hiding and later, with help from Mukhtar, escaped to Basra. The next morning, Mukhtar received allegiance from Kufans in the mosque on the basis of, "Book of God, Sunnah of the Prophet, revenge for the Prophet's family, defence of the weak and war on sinners".

Rule over Iraq

Support for Mukhtar's revolt came from two divergent groups: the Arab tribal nobility and the mawali. At first, he attempted to reconcile their differences and appease both. Most government positions, including the governorships of Mosul and al-Mada'in, were awarded to Arabs. Mawali, hitherto treated as lower-grade citizens, were entitled to war booty and army salaries and allowed to ride horses. He announced that any mawali slaves who joined him would be freed, resulting in increased support from this group. His personal guard was also staffed by mawali led by Abu Amra Kaysan. Nobles, however, were disturbed by his policies toward the mawali. At this stage he controlled most of Iraq and its dependencies including Arminiya, Adharbayjan, Jibal and parts of the Jazira (Upper Mesopotamia). Efforts by his supporters to take Basra, which was under Zubayrid control, did not succeed. By then Abd al-Malik ibn Marwan had taken reigns of the Umayyad power in Syria and was struggling to regain control of the lost provinces.

Counter-coup
One year after the Battle of Ayn al-Warda, the Umayyad army occupied Mosul and headed for Kufa. Mukhtar sent three thousand cavalrymen under the command of Yazid ibn Anas. On 17 July 686, they defeated the Umayyad army, twice their size, near Mosul. That evening, after ordering the execution of all the Syrian captives, Ibn Anas died of an illness. Having lost their commander, the Kufans retreated in the face of another Umayyad army. In Kufa, rumour spread that Mukhtar's forces had been defeated and Ibn Anas slain. In response, Mukhtar deployed seven thousand reinforcements headed by Ibn al-Ashtar. Taking advantage of the troops' absence, the Kufan nobility, whose relations with Mukhtar had grown estranged due to his favouritism toward the mawali, attempted to topple Mukhtar by besieging his palace. They accused him of robbing their prestige:  Despite the siege, Mukhtar was able to recall Ibn al-Ashtar. Three days after its departure from Kufa, Ibn al-Ashtar's army returned and defeated the revolt.

After eliminating his opposition, Mukhtar enacted punitive measures against those involved in the battle of Karbala. He executed most of them, including Umar ibn Sa'd and Shimr ibn Ziljawshan. Many others were killed under the pretext of their direct or indirect involvement in the battle, while about ten thousand Kufans fled to Basra. The houses of many absconders were destroyed. This further reduced Arab support for Mukhtar and he became increasingly reliant on mawali.

Battle of Khazir

Two days after reasserting control over Kufa, Mukhtar dispatched Ibn al-Ashtar with a thirteen thousand-strong force to confront the approaching Umayyad army led by Ibn Ziyad. Some of Mukhtar's soldiers carried a chair, circling around it, which they claimed belonged to Ali and would give them victory in the battle. The idea is said to have been Mukhtar's. He had invented it to increase his support among more religious people and compared it to the Ark of the Covenant, but orientalist Julius Wellhausen holds he was not the originator of the concept. He allowed them to carry the chair, as he needed their zeal. The armies met at the banks of Khazir River in early August 686. The Umayyad army was defeated, and many of the senior Umayyad military leaders including Ibn Ziyad and Husayn ibn Numayr al-Sakuni were killed. The exact date of the battle is unknown, although some sources put it on 6 August, coinciding with 10 Muharram, the date of Husayn's death. The death of Ibn Ziyad was seen as the fulfillment of Mukhtar's promise of revenge against Husayn's killers.

Relations with Ibn al-Zubayr
Sometime after expelling Ibn Muti, Mukhtar complained to Ibn al-Zubayr about the failure to keep his promise, despite Mukhtar having served him well. Mukhtar, nonetheless, offered his support if needed. Though Ibn al-Zubayr had considered Mukhtar loyal, the latter refused to surrender his control of Kufa to the caliph's appointed governor, Umar ibn Abd al-Rahman. The governor left the city after being bribed and threatened by Mukhtar.

In 686, Mukhtar feigned an offer of military support to Ibn al-Zubayr against an impending Umayyad attack on Medina with the ultimate intention of ousting him. Ibn al-Zubayr accepted and requested troops to Wadi al-Qura, a valley north of Medina, but instead, Mukhtar dispatched three thousand fighters under Shurahbil ibn Wars with orders to enter Medina until further notice. Meanwhile, Ibn al-Zubayr sent his confidant Abbas ibn Sahl at the head of a two thousand-strong force with instructions to escort Ibn Wars and his men to Wadi al-Qura in anticipation of the Syrian army and to kill Mukhtar's loyalists if they refused. Ibn Wars indeed refused and was killed along with most of his men. Mukhtar subsequently informed Ibn al-Hanafiyyah of his foiled plan to seize the region for the Alid and offered to send another army to Medina if Ibn al-Hanafiyyah notified the city's inhabitants that Mukhtar was working on his behalf. Ibn al-Hanafiyyah refused, citing his opposition to bloodshed. Nonetheless, Ibn al-Zubayr, after becoming aware of Mukhtar's intentions and fearing a pro-Alid revolt in the Hejaz, detained Ibn al-Hanafiyyah to forcibly gain his allegiance, hoping Mukhtar would follow suit. Ibn al-Hanafiyyah requested help from Mukhtar, who subsequently dispatched a four thousand-strong force to free him. This caused a further deterioration in relations between Mecca and Kufa.

Death

In 687, Mus'ab ibn al-Zubayr, the governor of Basra and younger brother of Abd Allah ibn al-Zubayr, launched an assault against Kufa. A sizable portion of his army consisted of Kufan nobles, who had previously fled Mukhtar's punitive measures. The size of Mukhtar's Kufan army is not certain with ranges between three thousand to sixty thousand, depending on the source. The Kufans retreated following their defeat at the battles of Madhar, located along the Tigris between Basra and Kufa, and Harura, a village near Kufa. Mus'ab then besieged Mukhtar's palace for four months. Ibn al-Ashtar, who was then governor of Mosul, did not attempt to relieve Mukhtar, either because he was not called to action, or because he refused Mukhtar's summons. In either case, he later joined Mus'ab. On 3 April 687, Mukhtar came out of the palace accompanied by nineteen supporters, (the remainder had refused to fight), and was killed fighting. Soon afterward, Mukhtar's remaining partisans, totaling about six thousand, surrendered and were executed by Mus'ab. One of Mukhtar's wives, Umrah bint Nu'man ibn Bashir al-Ansari, refused to denounce her husband's views and was consequently executed, while his other wife condemned him and was spared. Mukhtar's hand was cut off and hung on the wall of the mosque. His grave is, reportedly, located inside the shrine of Muslim ibn Aqil, at the back of the Great Mosque of Kufa. Some sources, however, state that Mus'ab had burned his body.

Legacy
Though Mukhtar ruled for less than two years, his ideology survived his death. It was during his rule that the mawali rose to significance, much to the dissatisfaction of the Kufan Arab nobility. He had proclaimed Muhammad ibn al-Hanafiyyah as the Mahdi and the Imam. This was likely the first reference to the Mahdi in the history of Islam. This idea became influential afterward, particularly in Shi'a Islam, where it became one of its central tenets. He was the first person to introduce the concept of Bada' (change in the divine will), when after defeat at the battle of Madhar, for which he had claimed he was promised victory, he said that God had changed his plan.
  
His followers later developed into a distinct Shi'a sect known as the Kaysanites. They introduced the doctrines of Occultation (Ghayba) and Return (Raj'a) of the Mahdi. After the death of Ibn al-Hanafiyyah, some Kaysanites believed that he had not died but was hidden in Mount Radwa and would return some day to rid the world of injustice. Most Kaysanites, however, declared his son Abu Hashim to be their Imam. He then transferred the Imamate to Muhammad ibn Ali ibn Abdallah ibn Abbas before dying. The Abbasids used this as a propaganda tool during their revolution to boost their legitimacy and appeal to pro-Alid masses. Two of Muhammad ibn Ali's sons, as-Saffah and al-Mansur, would eventually establish the Abbasid Caliphate. Describing similarities between Mukhtar and Abbasid revolutionary Abu Muslim Khorasani, who recruited both Arabs and mawali in his army and treated them as equals, Wellhausen writes: "If the doctrine of Raj'a is correct, then the Arab of Khutarnia [Mukhtar] came to life again in the Maula [mawlā] of Khutarnia [Abu Muslim]."

Many Muslims hold Mukhtar a liar who claimed prophethood and consider him an enemy of the Alids, who used their name to gain power, and executed Husayn's killers to consolidate his support among pro-Alids. According to Wellhausen, although he did not explicitly call himself a prophet, the allegations took root because of his boasting and excessive claims, which he made in the rhymed prose style of ancient Arabian soothsayers. Muhammad is reported to have said: "In Thaqif there will be a great liar and destroyer." To them, the liar is Mukhtar and the destroyer is Hajjaj ibn Yusuf. Shi'a, on the other hand, regard him a sincere partisan of Ali and his family, who avenged the murder of Husayn and his company. They maintain that the allegations levelled against him regarding prophethood, his role in the Kaysanites sect, and his lust for power are Umayyad and Zubayrid propaganda. Early Shi'a, however, had a hostile opinion of him, that arose from his attitude toward Hasan and his alleged incompetence during Ibn Aqil's revolt. His proclamation of Ibn al-Hanafiyyah, a non-Fatimid, may also have contributed to this as most Shi'a in later times adhered to the Fatimid line of Alids.

Views of the Alid family
There are differing accounts of how prominent members of the Alid family viewed Mukhtar. One account holds that Husayn's son and the fourth Shi'a Imam, Ali Zayn al-Abidin, prayed for him after seeing the heads of Ibn Ziyad and Umar ibn Sa'd, while another account holds that he rejected Mukhtar's gifts and called him a liar. Husayn's grandson, Muhammad al-Baqir, praised him: "Do not curse al-Mukhtār, for he killed those who killed us, sought our revenge, married our widows, and distributed wealth among us in times of hardship." Al-Baqir further praised him when Mukhtar's son asked al-Baqir about his opinion of Mukhtar. Husayn's great-grandson, Ja'far al-Sadiq, is reported to have said: "The Hāshimites neither combed nor dyed their hair until al-Mukhtār sent us the heads of those who killed al-Ḥusayn." Ja'far al-Sadiq is also reported to have said that Mukhtar used to lie about Ali Zayn al-Abidin.

Modern scholarly views
While early historical accounts are unanimous in portraying Mukhtar in a negative light, modern historians hold a variety of views. Wellhausen writes that although Mukhtar did not claim to be a prophet, he made every effort to create the impression that he was one, and spoke in a way as if he sat in the counsel of God. He concludes that Mukhtar was nevertheless a sincere man who tried to eradicate the social differences of his time. He further argues that Mukhtar made extravagant claims and exploited Ibn al-Hanafiyyah's name out of necessity, as he could not have achieved his goal in his own name. He calls him "... one of the greatest men of Islamic history; [who] anticipated the future". Historian Hugh Kennedy writes that Mukhtar was a revolutionary who tried to put together a united Kufan coalition but was beset by internal divisions and let down by the Alid family. Before his death, Mukhtar is reported to have said:  Middle East scholar Moshe Sharon describes this as an accurate description of his activities. Professor Abdulaziz Sachedina, on the other hand, calls him an ambitious politician who manipulated the religious sentiments of common people for his own good.

Popular references
As with Maqtal-namas narrating the synthesized version of the story of Karbala, various Mukhtar-namas romanticizing the events of the life and movement of Mukhtar were written during the Safavid era. An Iranian television series, Mokhtar Nameh, based on the Shi'a perspective of his life and revolt, was produced in 2009 garnering significant popularity.

Notes

References

Sources

 
 
 
 
 
 
 
 
 
 
 
 
 
 
 
 
 
 
 
 
 
 
 
 
 
 
 
 
 
 

622 births
687 deaths
Banu Thaqif
Iraqi Muslims
Iraq under the Umayyad Caliphate
People of the Second Fitna
7th-century Arabs
7th-century people from the Umayyad Caliphate
Tabi‘un